Kovač planina is a mountain in the municipality of Pljevlja, Montenegro.

See also
List of mountains in Montenegro

References

Mountains of Bosnia and Herzegovina
Mountains of Montenegro